Dahlgren may refer to:

Places
 Dahlgren, Illinois
 Dahlgren, Virginia
 Naval Surface Warfare Center Dahlgren Division
 Dahlgren Township, Carver County, Minnesota
 Dahlgren Township, Hamilton County, Illinois
Dahlgrens Corner, Virginia
 Dahlgren Chapel (Maryland)
 Dahlgren Chapel of the Sacred Heart, at Georgetown University
 Dahlgren Hall at the U.S. Naval Academy in Annapolis, Maryland
Dahlgren Railroad Heritage Trail in King George County, Virginia
Dahlgren River, river of Minnesota

Other uses
Dahlgren (surname), a Swedish surname
Dahlgren gun, type of smooth bore cannon designed by the Admiral and used by the U.S. Navy
 Dahlgren Affair, failed mission to assassinate leaders of the Confederacy
Dahlgren system and dahlgrenogram, created by Swedish-Danish botanist Rolf M. T. Dahlgren (1932–1987)
, Torpedo Boat No. 9/TB-9/Coast Torpedo Boat No. 4
 6945 Dahlgren  (1980 FZ3), Main-belt Asteroid discovered on March 16, 1980 by Lagerkvist, C.-I. at La Silla
Dahlgren Chapel (disambiguation)
 Dahlgren (fireboat), operated in Annapolis, Maryland, built by MetalCraft Marine

See also
Dhalgren, a science fiction novel by Samuel R. Delany